Rogozina is the feminine counterpart of the Slavic surname Rogozin. It may also refer to:

Poland
 Rogozina, Gryfice County
 Rogozina, Kołobrzeg County

Bulgaria
 Rogozina, Bulgaria